Nikhil Wagle is a journalist from the Indian state of Maharashtra.

Career

Print media 

Nikhil Wagle started his media career in 1977 as a freelance reporter. He later joined Dinank, a Marathi newsweekly, in Mumbai. In 1979, when the editor of Dinank resigned, the publisher asked 19-year-old Wagle to become the managing editor. Wagle later became the editor-in-chief of Dinank. Subsequently, he went to Pune, and joined Kirloskar Group, which owned a couple of magazines at that time. However, within one month, he quit his new job and came back to Mumbai.

In 1982, he started his own publishing house and started a new magazine called Akshar. In 1983, he started a sports magazine Shatkar with Sandeep Patil as editor. In 1985, he started a film magazine Chanderi, which was first edited by Rohini Hattangadi and then by Gautam Rajadhyaksha. He also published some Gujarati language magazines.

In 1990, he established the Marathi and Hindi newspaper Mahanagar. He also served as the editor of the Marathi version of the newspaper (Aapla Mahanagar). He became a noted critic of the political party Shiv Sena and its chief Bal Thackeray. For this reason, his office was attacked by the party's supporters multiple times, beginning in 1991.

In 1994, he criticized the Maharashtra legislators for paying fawning tributes to a deceased MLA accused of having criminal connections. When he refused to apologize to the legislators for the critical comments, he was imprisoned for a week. In August 2004, the Shiv Sena supporters beat him up and blackened his face with engine oil for being critical of the party leader Narayan Rane (who later joined Indian National Congress).

Wagle also brought out more than 80 books in the capacity of a publisher.

TV 

Wagle started anchoring in 1989. After doing shows for Doordarshan, he turned a socio-political commentator  and worked in Various private channels. He was also the anchor of the  talk show Amne Samne.

In mid-2000s, Wagle joined the Network 18 group. He became the editor-in-chief of IBN Lokmat, a Marathi news channel. He hosted the show Aajcha Sawal. He resigned in July 2014. He received the Sanskriti Award as a member of the IBN-Lokmat editorial team.

Soon after leaving IBN-Lokmat Wagle joined Maharashtra 1 new channel as the editor in chief. Many coworkers of Wagle left the network with him to join Maharashtra1 news channel. He carried his Marathi talk show Aajacha Sawal to Maaharashtra 1. In November 2016, he resigned from Maharashtra1.

From 1 May 2017, Wagle started a talk show "Sadetod" on TV9 Marathi news channel. The news channel dropped the show abruptly on July 20, 2017, as Twitted and confirmed by Nikhil.

Personal
Nikhil Wagle is married to Meena Karnik, who is also a journalist and media cell convener of Aam Aadmi Party He is an atheist.

References

Indian male journalists
1959 births
Living people
Journalists from Maharashtra
Marathi-language writers
Indian newspaper editors
Indian mass media owners
Indian atheists
20th-century Indian journalists